Fabricio Tomás Bustos Sein (born 28 April 1996) is an Argentine professional footballer who plays for Internacional. Primarily a right-back, he can also operate as a right-midfielder.

Club career
Born in Ucacha, Córdoba, Bustos first playing years were with local club Jorge Newbery. In 2008, he joined Independiente.

In 2016, Bustos was promoted to the senior squad by coach Gabriel Milito. He made his full professional debut on 5 December 2016, in a 1–0 home win over River Plate. He eventually secured a regular spot in the team, ending the 2016–17 season with an overall of 19 appearances.

International career
Bustos was a member of the  Argentine under-17 side that were crowned champions of the 2013 South American Under-17 Championship, appearing in 7 matches. In 2014, he made an appearance for the under-20 side, in a friendly against Ecuador.

On 27 August 2017, Bustos received his first senior call-up by coach Jorge Sampaoli for Argentina's 2018 World Cup qualifying matches against Uruguay and Venezuela. He made his debut on 23 March 2018, starting in a friendly against Italy which Argentina won by 2–0.

Career statistics

Club
.

International

Honours 
Independiente
 Copa Sudamericana: 2017

Argentina U18
 South American Under-17 Championship: 2013

References

External links

1996 births
Living people
Sportspeople from Córdoba Province, Argentina
Argentine footballers
Association football fullbacks
Expatriate footballers in Brazil
Argentine expatriate sportspeople in Brazil
Argentine Primera División players
Campeonato Brasileiro Série A players
Club Atlético Independiente footballers
Sport Club Internacional players
Argentina youth international footballers
Argentina under-20 international footballers
Argentina international footballers